Paul Friedrich Meyerheim (13 July 1842 – 14 September 1915) was a German painter and graphic artist. He did portraits and landscapes, but is best known as a painter of animals.

Life 

Paul Friedrich Meyerheim was born in Berlin on 13 July 1842. He and his brother took their first art lessons from his father. As a young boy, he was fascinated with the new Berlin Zoological Gardens and went there so often he was able to befriend Martin Lichtenstein, the zoo's founder, who allowed him into areas that were normally closed to the public. This experience led him to specialize in animal painting.

From 1857 to 1860 he attended the Prussian Academy of Arts. Later, he made several study trips to Switzerland, Belgium and the Netherlands and spent a year in Paris. In 1883, he established an animal painting class at the Academy. He was appointed a Professor there in 1887 and became a member of the Academic Senate.

Meyerheim was a friend of the Borsig family, owners of the Borsig-Werke, a company that manufactured railroad locomotives. He produced many illustrations and designs especially for them. A major attraction at the Great Berlin Art Exhibition in 1912 was a series of seven huge images, painted on copper, that he had done for the Borsigs in 1873/76. The panels were called "Lebensgeschichte einer Lokomotive" (Life History of a Locomotive) and were originally intended for the garden loggia at their home in Alt-Moabit. Some panels are now in the possession of the Märkisches Museum in Berlin-Mitte and the Deutschen Technikmuseum.

Paul Friedrich Meyerheim died in Berlin on 14 September 1915.

Other painters in the Meyerheim family 
His father was the painter Friedrich Eduard Meyerheim (1808–1879); his elder brother, Franz Eduard Meyerheim, was also a painter as were his uncles, Wilhelm Alexander (1815–1882) and Hermann (fl.1860s).

Panels from Life History of a Locomotive

See also 
 German Wikipedia: Lebensgeschichte einer Lokomotive
 List of Orientalist artists
 Orientalism

References

Further reading 
 Staatliche Museen Berlin: Kunst in Berlin 1648–1987. Henschelverlag, Berlin 1987, p. 298.
 Hans Joachim Neidhardt: Deutsche Malerei des 19. Jahrhunderts. E.A Seemann Verlag, Leipzig 1990, pp. 176, 258.
 Irmgard Wirth: Berliner Malerei im 19. Jahrhundert. Siedler Verlag, Berlin 1990, p. 418.

External links 

 Arcadja Auctions: 49 works by Meyerheim
 

1842 births
1915 deaths
Artists from Berlin
Prussian Academy of Arts alumni
19th-century German painters
19th-century German male artists
German male painters
20th-century German painters
20th-century German male artists
Orientalist painters